Vermont Public Co. is the public broadcaster serving the U.S. state of Vermont. Its headquarters, newsroom, and radio studios are located in Colchester, with television studios in Winooski. It operates two statewide radio services aligned with NPR, offering news and classical music, and the state's PBS service.

After being announced in September 2020, the Vermont Public Co. was formed on June 30, 2021, by the merger of Vermont PBS and Vermont Public Radio, which had been separate entities. The move brought together the 57 VPR employees with 42 at Vermont PBS to create the state's largest news organization, with $90 million in assets. The name Vermont Public was unveiled on June 23, 2022.

Radio 
Vermont Public's radio operation was formed in 1977 as Vermont Public Radio (VPR). It operates two networks, a news service on six main transmitters and a classical music service on seven main transmitters.

History 
In 1975, two groups—the Champlain Valley Educational Radio Association and Vermont Public Radio—were formed to seek funds to plan a new non-commercial radio station for Vermont. The Champlain Valley group proposed starting with one station in Burlington, while the Vermont Public Radio application focused on statewide coverage, in order to meet requirements from the Corporation for Public Broadcasting (CPB) for minimum population thresholds. In October, Vermont Public Radio received a $25,000 CPB grant, and two months later, the University of Vermont, which at the time administered Vermont ETV, approved the group to share some of its facilities. The existing public television system also shared a founder with the radio network: Raymond V. Phillips, who was considered "the father of public television in Vermont". While Phillips had long expressed interest in public radio, funding did not come until three local ministers objected to a local station's switch to a rock format.

The first transmitter to go on air was WVPA-FM 89.5, licensed to Windsor and broadcasting from Mount Ascutney, on August 13, 1977. Serving northern Vermont took longer because Vermont Public Radio's application was placed into comparative hearing with several commercial applicants, having filed for the non-reserved frequency of 107.9 MHz. The FCC approved VPR's request to move the frequency from Newport to Burlington despite opposition from a commercial broadcaster in Newport, and WVPS atop Mount Mansfield was activated on October 31, 1980. The Mount Ascutney and Mount Mansfield transmitters gave VPR coverage of 92 percent of the population—greater than Vermont ETV at the time—as well as in northeastern New York, New Hampshire, and Montreal.

Over the years, Vermont Public Radio added transmitters by construction as well as purchases of former commercial stations. WBTN-FM in Bennington was acquired as part of a package with its AM counterpart, WBTN, in 2000; the AM station briefly simulcast VPR programming with local news inserts and death notices until being sold and returned to commercial use. In 2006, VPR purchased the former WJAN in Sunderland, transmitting from Mount Equinox; it is now WVTQ.

In 2004, VPR started WNCH in Norwich, its first dedicated classical music station, and in 2007, it completed its split into two program services. After attempting to purchase WWPV-FM in Colchester from Saint Michael's College in 2007, resistance from student and community groups led to the college refusing to sell. Instead, VPR purchased WAVX, a Christian radio station licensed to Schuyler Falls, New York, and relaunched it as WOXR. When Saint Michael's obtained a low-power station construction permit in 2015, it then sold the high-power WWPV-FM facility to VPR for integration into the classical network as WVTX.

The VPR studios in Colchester were expanded in 2015, nearly doubling the size of the Fort Ethan Allen facility. $8 million was raised to finance the addition, which included a newsroom three times the size of the previous space—a converted storage attic—and a studio large enough to accommodate an audience.

In December 2022, Vermont Public announced it would acquire WWLR, which had been the student-run station at Northern Vermont University's Lyndonville campus, for integration into the classical network. Trustees of the university had been attempting to sell the license for months and nearly surrendered it in 2021.

Programs 
The news service airs major public radio news programs from NPR and other producers, including All Things Considered, Morning Edition, Here & Now, and Marketplace. Four days a week, Vermont Public produces its flagship radio program, Vermont Edition; currently hosted by Connor Cyrus and Mikaela Lefrak, the show was hosted by Jane Lindholm from 2007 to 2021. On weekends, local programs include the Vermont music showcase Safe & Sound.

The classical service offers blocks of classical music, some with local hosts and others from Classical 24.

Transmitters 
Transmitters are arranged alphabetically by call sign. All full-power transmitters broadcast in HD Radio, carrying the News and Classical services and the BBC World Service as subchannels. A blue background indicates a low-power translator of the full-power transmitter preceding it or, at the end of the table, an HD Radio subchannel of a transmitter in the other network.

Vermont Public News

Vermont Public Classical

Network maps

Television 
The Vermont Public television service was founded in 1967 as Vermont ETV and was operated by the University of Vermont from 1967 to 1989.

History 
The television service was established by an act of the Vermont General Assembly in 1966 as Vermont Educational Television (Vermont ETV), a service operated by the University of Vermont on behalf of all educational interests in the state. This culminated six years of efforts to set up the service, including two defeats in the 1963 and 1965 sessions of the General Assembly. Broadcasting began on October 16, 1967, from WETK (channel 33) atop Mount Mansfield. Three more transmitters went on air in the months that followed: WVTB (channel 20) on Burke Mountain serving St. Johnsbury, WVTA (channel 41) on Mount Ascutney to serve Windsor and southern Vermont, and WVER, broadcasting from Grandpa's Knob to serve Rutland. Delays in completing WVTA, which did not start until March 18, 1968, also held up the activation of WVER.

In 1975, the network began fundraising from the community, having been initially financed 90 percent by the state and later also receiving federal funds. 1979 saw Vermont ETV endure a 57-day strike by production personnel; the next year, the St. Johnsbury and Rutland transmitters narrowly avoided closure when the university voted to allow the installation of remote control equipment, allowing operators to control the facilities from the Mount Ascutney site.

The 1989 session of the General Assembly authorized Vermont ETV's separation from the university. However, funding continued to be a concern. In 1996, the Vermont Senate Appropriations Committee proposed cutting ETV's state funding to $1; it eventually was able to restore some of its allocation but still lost about half of its state grant. This was in contrast to Vermont Public Radio, which was not funded by the state and had more corporate contributors.

In 1997, Vermont ETV began 24-hour broadcasting; the name was changed to Vermont Public Television on January 1, 1998, and again to Vermont PBS in 2014. On February 17, 2009, the four main Vermont Public Television transmitters converted to digital broadcasting; in converting early, they joined most of the state's major commercial stations.

On February 17, 2017, Vermont PBS announced that it had sold the WVTA broadcast license for $56 million in the FCC's spectrum auction. In a statement, the network said that its other signals would be upgraded to cover the area served by WVTA. The WVTA license, which continued on the WVER multiplex, was then surrendered for cancellation on November 23, 2022. $52 million of the auction proceeds constitute the vast majority of Vermont Public's endowment, which stood at $71.9 million in 2021.

Shortly before the merger with Vermont Public Radio, Vermont PBS relocated from Fort Ethan Allen, where the two organizations were nearby, to facilities in Winooski.

Local programming 
The flagship local television program from Vermont Public is the weekly Vermont This Week, which features a rotating panel of Vermont political reporters. Another regular local program is the outdoors program Outdoor Journal.

Support in Canada 
Public television in Vermont has had a long history with viewers in Montreal, where its signal is received and widely distributed on cable and has been since April 1968. The large audience in Greater Montreal has been a major source of donations: in 1979, Vermont ETV received 60 percent of its donations from Quebec.

In 1989, Vidéotron, one of Montreal's major cable providers, removed Vermont ETV from its channel lineup and replaced with WCFE in nearby Plattsburgh, New York, to save on copyright fees; at the time, WCFE did not run the entire PBS schedule in order to provide a differentiated service from Vermont ETV. However, the move threatened the financial viability of Vermont ETV because, at the time, 15,000 of the 40,000 Vermont ETV contributors were Montreal-area Vidéotron customers who represented 25 percent of the network's fundraising revenue. Donations to Vermont ETV's March 1990 fundraising drive fell 27 percent. Vidéotron restored Vermont ETV to its lineup in 1991 after a year's absence.

The Canada Revenue Agency (CRA) revoked the status of the Public Television Association of Quebec, a charitable organization in Canada that had supported Vermont PBS's Canadian efforts. The CRA decision was unsuccessfully appealed to the Federal Court of Appeal, which ruled in 2015 that the association had "failed to maintain direction and control over its resources as it did not devote all its resources to its own charitable activities" and was only used to generate charitable tax receipts for Canadian donors.

Technical information

Transmitters 

Vermont Public holds three full-service television station licenses, one of which (WVER) is broadcast as a four-site distributed transmission system. WVER also has two separately licensed translators in Manchester and Pownal.

Subchannels 
All transmitters broadcast the same four subchannels.

Network map

Notes

References

External links 
 

NPR member networks

Vermont culture
Classical music radio stations in the United States
1977 establishments in Vermont
American radio networks
Radio stations established in 1977
PBS member networks
Television stations in Vermont
Television channels and stations established in 1967
1967 establishments in Vermont